Sajid Ali (born 1 July 1963) is a former Pakistani cricketer who played 13 ODIs between 1984 and 1997.

He had an unusually extended first-class cricket career, from 1982/83 until his last match for Pakistan Customs in December 2005, a period of 22 years. For the majority of his first-class career he played for National Bank of Pakistan for whom he scored over 10,000 runs, a record for the team.

Sajid Ali played 13 one-day internationals for Pakistan over almost as many years without ever producing a performance to suggest that he would be a regular in the side. In 12 ODI innings he only scraped 130 runs, with a best of 28. His first-class career was as prolonged, stretching over 22 seasons.

In February 2020, he was named in Pakistan's squad for the Over-50s Cricket World Cup in South Africa. However, the tournament was cancelled during the third round of matches due to the coronavirus pandemic.

References

External links

1963 births
Living people
Cricketers from Karachi
Pakistani cricketers
Pakistan One Day International cricketers
Karachi cricketers
National Bank of Pakistan cricketers
Karachi Greens cricketers
Karachi Blues cricketers
Karachi Whites cricketers
Pakistan Customs cricketers
Bahawalpur cricketers